The Mayas, also called Mayas LFA or Mayas Puebla, were an American football team based in Mexico City (CDMX), Mexico. The Mayas competed in the Central Division of the Liga de Fútbol Americano Profesional, the top American football league in Mexico. The Mayas played their home games at the Estadio Wilfrido Massieu. 

Mayas was the most successful team in the LFA until it folded in 2020, winning the championship twice in 2016 and 2017, and qualifying for playoffs every season as of 2019.

History

Club origins
The club was founded on 4 November 2015 as one of the charter members of the Liga de Fútbol Americano Profesional, alongside Condors, Eagles and Raptors. The team picked navy blue and white as their colours. Originally, the team nickname was supposed to be Mexicas after coming first in a poll among fans, nevertheless, the name Mexicas was already registered, therefore, the team had to pick the name that finished second in the poll: Mayas. The name Mayas, refers to the Maya people.

Ernesto Alfaro era (2016–2018)
On their first season, the team finished with a 4–2 regular season record, qualifying for the Tazón México I, where they defeated the Raptors 29–13, winning the league's inaugural championship.

For the 2017 season, Mayas finished as the best team in the league with a 6–1 regular season record. They defeated the Eagles 40–18 at the divisional game and became two-time champions of the LFA after winning the Tazón México II 24–18 to the Dinos.

On their third season, Mayas qualified for playoffs for third time in a row after finishing with a 5–2 regular season record and as leaders of the Central Division and best team in the league. Despite this, the team lost in the divisional game 17–27 against Mexicas. 

In April 2018, after losing the divisional game against Mexicas, head coach Ernesto Alfaro announced his departure from the team. As head coach of the Mayas, Alfaro won two Tazón México championships and managed to qualify for the playoffs during his three seasons in charge of the team with a 18–6 overall record.

Francisco Chaparro era (2019–)
In 2019, the team again qualified for playoffs, making it to postseason for fourth time in a row, after defeating Artilleros 25–20 at the Estadio Templo del Dolor in the last game of the season.

Hiatus
Mayas had moved to Puebla, Mexico after their first 4 season in Mexico city. The team had intended to be in hiatus for the 2020 season prior to the pandemic in Mexico. In 2021, it was confirmed by the commissioner that the Mayas will remain on hiatus until the team acquires investors.

Stadiums

In 2016, for the inaugural season of the LFA, all of the four founding teams (Condors, Eagles, Raptors and Mayas) played all their matches at the Estadio Jesús Martínez "Palillo", in the Magdalena Mixhuca Sports City.

While other teams left for new stadiums the next season (the Raptors moved to the Estadio José Ortega Martínez in Naucalpan, for instance), the Mayas stayed at the "Palillo" Martínez stadium for the 2017 and 2018 seasons.

Previous to the 2019 season, it was announced that the Mayas would move to the Estadio Wilfrido Massieu in the main campus of the Instituto Politécnico Nacional in northern Mexico City. The stadium is normally used by the IPN's college football teams. 

Though it has not been officially stated by the league, one of the probable causes of the Mayas leaving the "Palillo" Martínez stadium, is the fact that the stadium has been designated as a shelter for Central American migrants by Mexico City's government.

With a capacity of 13,000 spectators, the Estadio Wilfrido Massieu is currently the largest venue in the Liga de Fútbol Americano Profesional.

Staff

Roster

Season-by-season

Awards

 Tazón México
 Champions (2): (2016, 2017)

 Central Division
 Champions (1): (2017)

Notable players
 Ramiro Pruneda – OT (2017–2019)
 Diego Viamontes – WR (2018–2019)

References

American football teams in Mexico
2015 establishments in Mexico
American football teams established in 2015
Sports teams in Mexico City